Mount Kialagvik is a small, poorly known stratovolcano on the Alaska Peninsula of Alaska, United States, located in the Aleutian Range about 10 miles (16 km) northeast of Mount Chiginagak. It is informally named after the Eskimo word for nearby Wide Bay. Kialagvik has not erupted in historic time.

See also
 List of mountains in Alaska
 List of volcanoes in the United States

References

Volcanoes of Kodiak Island Borough, Alaska
Mountains of Kodiak Island Borough, Alaska
Stratovolcanoes of the United States
Volcanoes of Alaska
Mountains of Alaska
Holocene stratovolcanoes